In 2010–11 the Saudi First Division, the second-tier league of football in Saudi Arabia, was won by Club Hajer of the Al-Ahsa region. Along with Al-Ansar F.C. they were promoted to the Saudi Professional League.

Teams

Stadia and locations

Final League table

External links 
 Saudi Arabia Football Federation
 Saudi League Statistics
 goalzz

Saudi First Division League seasons
Saudi
2